The Salisbury Zoological Park, commonly referred to as the Salisbury Zoo, is a  zoo located on the Delmarva Peninsula in the Salisbury, Maryland city park.  The Salisbury Zoo chooses to mainly house species native to North, South America, and Australia.  Its collection of over 100 animals includes wallabies, American alligators, flamingos, North American river otters, ocelots, Patagonian mara, red wolves, two-toed sloths, alpaca, turtles, macaws, rescued birds of prey and owls, and an Andean spectacled bear.
Admission at the Salisbury Zoo is free.

History
The zoo was founded in 1954, with the placement of some animals on permanent display, in the city park. Improvements made in the 1970s focused on providing more naturalistic enclosures for the zoo's animals.

The zoo is currently run by a nine (9)-member Salisbury Zoo Commission; appointed by the mayor of Salisbury, and confirmed by the city council, the zoo is funded predominantly by this commission, as well as the City of Salisbury, and the nonprofit group, the Delmarva Zoological Society.

The Zoo raised nearly $3 million in a joint campaign for an animal health clinic, a new Environmental Center, and a new exhibit of Australian animals.

Spectacled bears
The Salisbury Zoo was the home of one of the longest-lived captive-bred spectacled, or Andean, bear in the world (as of 2011). These bears are the only endemic bear species to South America, being found in subtropical to tropical Andean foothills and forested regions of Venezuela, Colombia, Ecuador, Perú, Bolivia, with some rare sightings being reported from Panamá, as well. The bear, named "Poopsie", was born on December 27, 1973, at the Baltimore Zoo, arriving at the Salisbury Zoo when she was only seven months old, on July 18, 1974. Poopsie bore two litters of cubs in 1980 and 1981, both of which she happened to outlive. Spectacled bears in the wild generally live to be 25 years old, rarely reaching or exceeding 30. Poopsie turned 37 in December 2010. She was unfortunately euthanized on November 9, 2011, following arthritic conditions, compromised mobility, and other issues associated with age.

The zoo was also home Andean bear, "Gritto", born July 28, 1991. He would go on to successfully be the oldest Andean bear to become a father, at a mature age (for bears) of 22, when he sired a female cub named "Alba", born on January 23, 2015. Gritto was sadly put to sleep on October 15, 2015, at 24 years of age, after suffering from a stroke.

References

External links

Zoos in Maryland
Buildings and structures in Salisbury, Maryland
1954 establishments in Maryland
Tourist attractions in Wicomico County, Maryland
Zoos established in 1954